Wheeler Island may refer to:
Wheeler Island, India
Wheeler Island (Queensland), Australia
Wheeler Island (California), United States
Wheeler Island, Connecticut, United States
Wheeler Islands (West Virginia), United States